The Mauboussin M.200 was a French racing monoplane built by Fouga. It was a low-wing cantilever monoplane with a fixed tailskid landing gear. It had an enclosed cockpit for a pilot, and was powered by a Régnier  4E.0 engine. It first flew on 21 March 1939, and in May 1939 established new FAI records for an aircraft of its class.

Variants
M.200The first prototype of a single-seat training / racing aircraft, powered by a  Régnier 4E.0 inverted air-cooled in-line piston engine, first flown on 21 March 1939. 
M.201A second airframe produced and supposed to be powered by a  Régnier 4E.0. 
M.202A second flyable prototype which might use the airframe of M.201 powered by a  Régnier 4E.0, first flown in June 1941.

Specifications

References

Bibliography

 The Illustrated Encyclopedia of Aircraft (Part Work 1982-1985), 1985, Orbis Publishing, Page 2435

External links

 Aviafrance article in French

Mauboussin aircraft
1930s French sport aircraft
Low-wing aircraft
Single-engined tractor aircraft
Aircraft first flown in 1939